During the 1999–2000 season, Red Star Belgrade participated in the 1999–2000 First League of FR Yugoslavia, 1999–2000 FR Yugoslavia Cup and 1999–2000 UEFA Cup.

Season summary
Red Star won their seventh double in this season. The 17-year-old Red Star fan Aleksandar Radović was killed by a signaling rocket fired from Partizan fans during the 113th Eternal derby.

On 7 August 1999, Red Star played a friendly match against Real Madrid.

Squad

Results

Overview

First League of FR Yugoslavia

FR Yugoslavia Cup

UEFA Cup

Qualifying round

First round

See also
 List of Red Star Belgrade seasons

References

Red Star Belgrade seasons
Red Star
Serbian football championship-winning seasons